The Boccia Individual BC2 event at the 2008 Summer Paralympics was held in the Olympic Green Convention Center on 7–9 September.
The preliminary stages consisted of 7 round-robin groups of 4 competitors each. The winner of each group plus the best second place player qualified for the final stages. 
The event was won by Kwok Hoi Ying Karen, representing Hong Kong.

Results
 indicates matches in which an extra (fifth) end was played

Preliminaries

Pool A

Pool B

Pool C

Pool D

Pool E

Pool F

Pool G

Competition bracket

References

Boccia at the 2008 Summer Paralympics